Alessandro Milan (born 5 December 1970) is an Italian radio and television presenter and journalist.

Television 
 Funanboli – (7 Gold, 2013-2014)

References

External links 

1970 births
Living people
Mass media people from Milan
Italian television journalists
Italian radio presenters
Italian television presenters